The canton of Château-Gontier-sur-Mayenne-1 (before March 2020: canton of Azé) is an administrative division of the Mayenne department, northwestern France. It was created at the French canton reorganisation which came into effect in March 2015. Its seat is in Château-Gontier-sur-Mayenne.

It consists of the following communes:
 
Bierné-les-Villages
Château-Gontier-sur-Mayenne (partly)
Châtelain
Chemazé
Coudray
Daon
Fromentières
Gennes-Longuefuye
Houssay
Ménil
Origné
La Roche-Neuville
Saint-Denis-d'Anjou

References

Cantons of Mayenne